The Baird Brothers Trophy is awarded the winner of the annual college football game between the Spartans of Case Western Reserve University and the Fighting Scots of The College of Wooster.  The idea for the trophy originated with brothers Bob and Bill Baird, economics professors at Case and Wooster, respectively, for whom the trophy is named. The trophy was created by American artist Eugenie Torgerson, who was married to Bob Baird at the time. The winning school gets to keep the trophy, a distinctive chain of brass fish representing each game played in the rivalry, and gets to add a new fish to the chain to represent that year's game.   A four-inch blue gill signified the first 21–14 narrow win for Case Western Reserve.  Other fish represented on the trophy include a northern pike, a flounder, a carp, a walleye, a catfish, a rainbow trout, a sturgeon, a sucker, a crappie, a muskie, a sheepshead, a gar, a largemouth bass, and a smallmouth bass.

In 1996, Sports Illustrated recognized the Baird Brothers Trophy as one of the most distinctive in college football.
In October 2012, the trophy was highlighted on ESPN College GameDay.

Wooster leads the series 13–12.

The teams last met on October 6, 2012 at Cleveland, a 31–28 victory for Spartans.

Game results

References

College football rivalry trophies in the United States
Case Western Spartans football
Wooster Fighting Scots football
1984 establishments in Ohio